Kapuso sa Pasko (A GMA Christmas Album) is a Christmas music album released under GMA Records, distributed by Warner Music.

Track listing

Awards
Best Christmas Recording (18th Awit Awards)

See also
GMA Network

2004 Christmas albums
2004 compilation albums
Christmas compilation albums
Christmas albums by Filipino artists
GMA Music compilation albums
Warner Music Group compilation albums